Basse is a hamlet in the Dutch province of Overijssel. It is located in the municipality Steenwijkerland, about 7 km northwest of Steenwijk.

It was first mentioned in 1425 as Bassinghe, and means "settlement belonging to Basse (person)". It is a stretched out settlement. The farm Bassinghe used to contain a clandestine church.

Since 1983, Basse organises the "Battle of Basse", a car and motocross on a dirt track.

References

Populated places in Overijssel
Steenwijkerland